The 2011 Montana Grizzlies football team represented the University of Montana in the 2011 NCAA Division I FCS football season. were led by second-year head coach Robin Pflugrad and played their home games at Washington–Grizzly Stadium. They are a member of the Big Sky Conference.

The team finished the regular season with an overall 9–2 record, 7–1 in Big Sky play. They then won two FCS playoff games, before being eliminated in the semifinals by Sam Houston State, thus ending their season with an overall 11–3 record. On  July 26, 2013, Montana was sanctioned by the NCAA, which found that "boosters provided extra benefits to players." Montana vacated its last five wins of the 2011 season (three during the regular season and two in the postseason) and its participation in the NCAA playoffs, resulting in an official record of 6–3 overall, 5–1 in conference play.

Schedule

Regular season

Tennessee

Cal Poly

Eastern Washington

Sacramento State

Northern Colorado

Idaho State

Portland State

Northern Arizona

Weber State*

Western Oregon*

Montana State*

 On July 26, 2013, the NCAA sanctioned Montana and forced it to vacate its last five wins of the 2011 season, Big Sky Conference co-championship and NCAA FCS playoff participation.

FCS Playoffs

Second Round–Central Arkansas*

Quarterfinals–Northern Iowa*

Semifinals–Sam Houston State

 On July 26, 2013, the NCAA sanctioned Montana and forced it to vacate its last five wins of the 2011 season, Big Sky Conference co-championship and NCAA FCS playoff participation.

Rankings

NCAA investigation and sanctions
In 2013, the NCAA investigated the University of Montana for violations of regulations concerning gifts to student athletes. On July 26, 2013, the NCAA announced its finding that the university had insufficiently monitored its football program, enabling boosters to provide gifts and services to players against NCAA regulations.

Much of the investigation centered on events surrounding the arrests of two Montana football players, cornerback Trumaine Johnson and backup quarterback Gerald Kemp, in October 2011. The NCAA found that boosters provided the players with bail and free legal counsel, in violation of NCAA rules. Several university personnel, including then-coach Robin Pflugrad, then-athletics director Jim O’Day, and the university compliance officer, evidently knew details of the situation but did not report them. The investigation also found that six boosters had provided smaller benefits to players over 100 times between 2004 and 2012.

Montana faced several penalties as a result of the investigation, most of which it self-imposed. Montana vacated five wins from the 2011 season in which Johnson and Kemp had played, including a win in the rivalry game against Montana State and two FCS playoff victories, vacating the school's participation in the FCS playoffs. Montana was also subjected to a probationary period and lost four scholarships in each of those years.

References

Montana
Montana Grizzlies football seasons
Big Sky Conference football champion seasons
Montana
Montana Grizzlies football